Na Arreenich (born 8 December 1956) is a former Thai naval officer. He served as commander-in-chief of the Royal Thai Navy from 1 October 2015 to 30 September 2017. Naris Pratumsuwan was appointed as his successor.

References 

Living people
1956 births
Place of birth missing (living people)
Na Arreenich
Na Arreenich
Na Arreenich